Jason Bryan Ticse Deutchman (born September 27, 1986) is a Filipino-American former basketball player. He last played for the Kia Picanto of the Philippine Basketball Association (PBA). He was selected 10th overall in the 2012 PBA draft by the GlobalPort Batang Pier.

Professional career
Midway through his rookie season, Deutchman was traded from the Batang Pier to the Petron Blaze Boosters as part of a three team trade that also sent Japeth Aguilar to Barangay Ginebra as well as sending Jay Washington and Yousef Taha to GlobalPort.

On February 18, 2014, he was traded, along with the Beermen's second-round picks in 2016 and 2017 to Barako Bull in exchange for Rico Maierhofer.

In December 2015, Deutchman was signed by the Pilipinas MX3 Kings of the ABL.

PBA career statistics

Season-by-season averages

|-
| align="left" | 
| align="left" | GlobalPort / Petron Blaze
| 31 || 16.8 || .380 || .330 || .733 || 7.2 || .5 || .7 || .4 || 10.3
|-
| align="left" | 
| align="left" | Petron Blaze / Barako Bull
| 21 || 8.0 || .310 || .300 || .588 || 2.0 || .4 || .3 || .1 || 3.8
|-
| align="left" | 
| align="left" | Barako Bull / Kia
| 10 || 13.1 || .410 || .350 || .750 || 4.6 || .6 || .2 || .1 || 8.1
|-
| align="left" | Career
| align="left" |
| 62 || 13.2 || .366 || .323 || .697 || 4.6 || .5 || .5 || .3 || 7.4

References

1986 births
Living people
American sportspeople of Filipino descent
ASEAN Basketball League players
Barako Bull Energy players
Basketball players from Los Angeles
Filipino men's basketball players
NorthPort Batang Pier players
Terrafirma Dyip players
Power forwards (basketball)
San Miguel Beermen players
Small forwards
American men's basketball players
NorthPort Batang Pier draft picks
University of Wisconsin–Milwaukee alumni
San Diego State Aztecs men's basketball players
Citizens of the Philippines through descent